The Green Party of New Jersey is the state party organization for New Jersey of the Green Party of the United States. It was founded in January 1997 by Nick Mellis (chair from 2008 to 2009) and Steve Welzer.

Activity 
The Green Party of New Jersey is an active Green Party of the U.S. state affiliate, having nominated over 150 candidates for office since it began in 1997. The party experienced its first non-partisan electoral victory in 1999 when Gary Novosielski was elected to the Board of Education of the Rutherford School District.

In January 2003, Matt Ahearn, a New Jersey state legislator who had been elected to the New Jersey General Assembly as a Democrat in 2002, switched his registration to the Green Party, becoming the party's first state-level representative. Ahearn ran for re-election as a Green Party candidate in 2003 but lost to Robert M. Gordon, the Democratic candidate for office.

In 2012 2012, medical marijuana advocate Ken Wolski was the Green Party nominee for U.S. Senator. He finished fourth out of eleven candidates.

In May 2016, the Green Party of New Jersey saw a spike in registration with as many new voters in two months as it had in the past four years. By the end of 2016, there were 3,252 voters registered as Green.

In the 2016 election, Green Camden City Council candidate Gary Frazier received 6% of the vote, and Green Congressional candidates Raj Mailiah and Steve Welzer each received 0.7%.

The Green Party of New Jersey's 2017 gubernatorial candidate was Rev. Seth Kaper-Dale of Highland Park with Lisa R. Durden of Newark as his running mate. By November 2017, ten New Jersey counties had local affiliates recognized by the state party: Monmouth, Ocean, Atlantic, Gloucester, Essex, Camden, Bergen, Union, Mercer, and Morris.

Two candidates ran in the 2018 general election: professor and activist Madelyn Hoffman for U.S. Senate, and attorney and activist Diane Moxley for Congressional District 7. Hoffman received 25,150 votes and Moxley received 2,676 votes.

State party co-chair Craig Cayetano ran for Hawthorne Council in 2019 and 2020. Madelyn Hoffman ran for U.S. Senate again in the 2020 election, winning 38,288 votes and coming in third. Incumbent Jessica Clayton ran for a second term on the Brick, NJ school board and lost after a very close recount.

Green Party affiliate Dr. Corey Teague serves on the Paterson Board of Education after being elected in 2019 with the largest number of votes.

As of August 2021, there were 11,758 registered Greens in New Jersey. The party plans to run multiple candidates for state assembly and for statewide office, including governor, in future elections.

Officeholders

Current
Rev. Dr. Corey Teague, Commissioner, Board of Education, Paterson (2019–present)

Former
Gary Novosielski, Board of Education, Rutherford (member April 1999-December 2015, president January 2014-December 2015).
Jessica Clayton, Board of Education, Brick (2018-2020)

Endorsed candidates
In 2019, Green Party endorsed candidate Corey Teague, who won a seat on the Paterson School Board.

Election results

Governor

U.S. Senate

Presidential nominee results

See also 
 Seth Kaper-Dale
 Politics of New Jersey
 Government of New Jersey
 Elections in New Jersey
 Political party strength in New Jersey
 Law of New Jersey
 List of politics by U.S. state

References

External links 

 Young Ecosocialists of the United States
 Green Party candidates database
 

 
New Jersey
Political parties in New Jersey